Gaudy Night (1935) is a mystery novel by Dorothy L. Sayers, the tenth featuring Lord Peter Wimsey, and the third including Harriet Vane.

The dons of Harriet Vane's alma mater, the all-female Shrewsbury College, Oxford (based on Sayers' own Somerville College), have invited her back to attend the annual Gaudy celebrations. However, the mood turns sour when someone begins a series of malicious acts including poison-pen messages, obscene graffiti, and wanton vandalism. Despite the dons' reluctance to share the secret with an outsider, Harriet convinces them to let her bring in Lord Peter Wimsey to assist the investigation -- but his involvement is not without complications, both personal and professional.

Plot
Harriet Vane returns with trepidation to her alma mater, Shrewsbury College, Oxford to attend the Gaudy dinner. Expecting hostility because of her notoriety (she had stood trial for murder in an earlier novel, Strong Poison), she is surprised to be welcomed warmly by most of the dons, and rediscovers her old love of the academic life. Harriet's short stay is, however, marred by her discovery of a sheet of paper with an offensive drawing, and a poison pen message referring to her as a "dirty murderess".

Some time later the Dean of Shrewsbury writes to ask for her help. There has been an outbreak of vandalism and anonymous letters, and fearing for the college's reputation if this becomes public knowledge, the Dean wants someone to investigate confidentially. Harriet, herself a victim of poison-pen letters since her trial, reluctantly agrees, and returns to spend some months in residence, ostensibly to do research on Sheridan Le Fanu and to assist a don with her book. The timing of the first poison pen message during the gaudy, and the use of a Latin quotation from the Aeneid during one disturbance, focuses suspicion on the Senior Common Room dons, causing escalating tensions.

As Harriet wrestles with the case, trying to narrow down the list of suspects who might be responsible for poison-pen messages, obscene graffiti, wanton vandalism including the destruction of a set of scholarly proofs, and the crafting of vile effigies, she is forced to examine her ambivalent feelings about Wimsey, about love and marriage, and about her attraction to academia as an intellectual and emotional refuge. Wimsey eventually arrives in Oxford to help, and she gains a new perspective from those who know him, including his nephew, an undergraduate at the university.

The attacks build to a crisis. There is an attempt to drive a vulnerable student to suicide and a physical assault on Harriet that almost kills her. The perpetrator is finally unmasked as Annie Wilson, one of the college scouts, revealed to be the widow of a disgraced University of York academic. Her husband's academic fraud had been exposed by an examiner, destroying his career and driving him to suicide; his suicide note used the Latin quote eventually used by Wilson. The examiner later moved to Shrewsbury College, and the widow's campaign has been her revenge against the examiner in particular and more generally against intellectual women who move outside what she sees as their proper domestic sphere.

At the end of the book, with Wimsey admitting his own faults in his attempts at courtship and having come to terms with her own feelings, Harriet finally accepts Wimsey's proposal of marriage.

Principal characters

Harriet Vane – protagonist, a mystery writer
Lord Peter Wimsey – protagonist, an aristocratic amateur detective
Letitia Martin – Dean of Shrewsbury College
Helen de Vine – new Research Fellow at Shrewsbury College
Miss Lydgate – Harriet's former tutor
Dr Baring – Warden of Shrewsbury College
Miss Hillyard – history don at Shrewsbury College
Phoebe Tucker – Harriet's old college friend
Viscount Saint-George – Lord Peter's nephew, an undergraduate at Christ Church, Oxford
Reggie Pomfret – undergraduate at Queen's College
Miss Burrows – College librarian
Annie Wilson – scout at Shrewsbury College
Padgett – Head Porter at Shrewsbury College
Bunter – Lord Peter's manservant

Title

A "gaudy", at the  University of Oxford, is a college feast, typically a reunion for its alumni. The term "gaudy night" appears in Shakespeare's Antony and Cleopatra: "Let's have one other gaudy night: call to me / All my sad captains; fill our bowls once more / Let's mock the midnight bell".

Literary significance and criticism
Writing in 1936, George Orwell disagreed with the opinion of an Observer critic who felt that Gaudy Night had put Miss Sayers "definitely among the great writers". Orwell concluded, to the contrary, that "her slickness in writing has blinded many readers to the fact that her stories, considered as detective stories, are very bad ones. They lack the minimum of probability that even a detective story ought to have, and the crime is always committed in a way that is incredibly tortuous and quite uninteresting".

Although no murder occurs in Gaudy Night, it includes a great deal of suspense and psychological thrills. The narrative is interwoven with a love story and an examination of women's struggles to enlarge their roles and achieve some independence within the social climate of 1930s England, and the novel has been described as "the first feminist mystery novel".

Jacques Barzun stated that "Gaudy Night is a remarkable achievement. Harriet Vane and Saint-George, the undergraduate nephew of Lord Peter, help give variety, and the college setting justifies good intellectual debate. The motive is magnificently orated on by the culprit in a scene that is a striking set-piece. And though the Shrewsbury dons are sometimes hard to distinguish one from another, the College architecture is very good".

Gaudy Night deals with a number of philosophical themes, such as the right relation between love and independence or between principles and personal loyalties. Susan Haack has an essay on Gaudy Night as a philosophical novel.

Women's education

The issue of women's right to academic education is central to the book's plot. The lecturers of Shrewsbury College are veterans of the prolonged struggle for academic degrees for women, which Oxford granted only reluctantly. The Fellows of the college are surprised and a bit dismayed at the attitude of their students, who take for granted this right for which such a hard struggle had to be fought.

Sayers had herself been one of the first women to obtain an Oxford university degree, having been awarded first-class honours in the mediaeval literature examinations of 1915. She attended Somerville College, the basis for the fictional Shrewsbury College of the plot.

Adaptations
The book was adapted as a three-part series for BBC television in 1987, starring Edward Petherbridge as Wimsey and Harriet Walter as Harriet.

In 2005 a dramatisation of the novel was released on CD by the BBC Radio Collection, with Joanna David as Harriet and Ian Carmichael as Wimsey, later broadcast on BBC Radio 7 in 2010.

See also

References

External links
 
 Annotations and explanations by Bill Peschel 
 "Gaudy Night — More Than a Mystery", 2013 review by Faith Ann Colburn

1935 British novels
Campus novels
Novels by Dorothy L. Sayers
Novels set in University of Oxford
British philosophical novels
Victor Gollancz Ltd books
British mystery novels
Novels set in the 1930s
British novels adapted into television shows